Antic may refer to:

 Antić, a Serbo-Croatian surname (with a list of people surnamed Antić)
 Joseph Antic, Indian field hockey player at the 1960 Olympics
 ANTIC, a custom video chip in the Atari 8-bit computers
 Antic (magazine), a defunct American Atari computer magazine
 Antic Software, a software publisher run by Antic magazine
 Antic Collective, a British pub chain

See also 
 Antics (disambiguation)